This is a list of all the Ultra prominent peaks (with topographic prominence greater than 1,500 metres) in Antarctica. Some islands in the South Atlantic have also been included and can be found at the end of the list.

Antarctica

South Atlantic

Sources

Antarctica Ultras

Ultras